Jouko Karjalainen (born 27 July 1956 in Kajaani) is a Finnish former nordic combined skier. He won two silver medals in the individual Nordic combined at the 1980 Winter Olympics and the 1984 Winter Olympics.

Karjalainen also has four FIS Nordic World Ski Championships medals, including two silvers (3 x 10 km team: 1982 (tied with Norway), 1984) and two bronzes (15 km individual and 3 x 10 km team: Both 1985).

He also won the Nordic combined event at the Holmenkollen ski festival in 1981.

References

Holmenkollen winners since 1892 - click Vinnere for downloadable pdf file 

1956 births
Nordic combined skiers at the 1980 Winter Olympics
Nordic combined skiers at the 1984 Winter Olympics
Finnish male Nordic combined skiers
Living people
Holmenkollen Ski Festival winners
Olympic Nordic combined skiers of Finland
People from Kajaani
Olympic medalists in Nordic combined
FIS Nordic World Ski Championships medalists in Nordic combined
Medalists at the 1984 Winter Olympics
Medalists at the 1980 Winter Olympics
Olympic silver medalists for Finland
Sportspeople from Kainuu
20th-century Finnish people